The following highways are numbered 620:

Canada

Costa Rica
 National Route 620

Germany
 Bundesautobahn 620

United States